An Jin-su (born 26 December 1961) is a South Korean handball player. He competed in the men's tournament at the 1984 Summer Olympics.

References

External links

1961 births
Living people
South Korean male handball players
Olympic handball players of South Korea
Handball players at the 1984 Summer Olympics
Place of birth missing (living people)
20th-century South Korean people